Onningu Vannengil is a 1985 Indian Malayalam-language film,  directed by Joshiy and produced by Sajan. The film stars Mammootty, Nadia Moidu, Jagathy Sreekumar, Thilakan and Shankar. The film has musical score by Shyam.

Cast
Mammootty as Mohandas
Shankar as Baby/Thankachan
Nadia Moidu as Meera
Jagathy Sreekumar as Esthappan
Thilakan as Pankajakshan Menon
Lissy Priyadarshan as Priya Menon
James
Lalithasree 
Lalu Alex as Lal
Paravoor Bharathan

Release
The film was released on 20 June 1985.

Box office
The film was both commercial and critical success.

Soundtrack
The music was composed by Shyam with lyrics by Poovachal Khader.

References

External links
 

1985 films
1980s Malayalam-language films
Films directed by Joshiy